Mesomelaena is a genus of sedges. It has 5 known species, all endemic to Western Australia.

Species:
Mesomelaena graciliceps (C.B.Clarke) K.L.Wilson
Mesomelaena preissii Nees
Mesomelaena pseudostygia K.L.Wilson
Mesomelaena stygia (R.Br.) Nees
Mesomelaena tetragona (R.Br.) Benth. - Semaphore Sedge

References

External links
Florabase, the Western Australia Flora, Mesomelaena Nees 
Friends of Queens Park Bushland, Mesomelaena tetragona, Common name: Semaphore Sedge

Cyperaceae
Cyperaceae genera
Flora of Western Australia
Endemic flora of Australia